Physoschistura chulabhornae is a species of loach, a freshwater fish in the family Nemacheilidae. It was described in 2013 from the Chaophraya River drainage of the Chiangmai  province of Thailand.

References

Suvarnaraksha, A. (2013)  A new species of Physoschistura (Pisces: Nemacheilidae) from northern Thailand. Zootaxa, 3736 (3): 236–248.

Fish of Thailand
Taxa named by Apinun Suvarnaraksha
Fish described in 2013
Nemacheilidae